Bear Brand is a drink and powdered milk brand introduced in 1892 in the Philippines by the "Bernese Alps Milk Company", and currently owned by Nestlé. The brand is available in most areas of Southeast Asia, East Asia, and Eastern Africa. It was marketed under the brand name "Marca Oso", which is Spanish for "Bear Brand". The brand's Indonesian name is "Susu Cap Beruang".

In 2014, a consumer research firm ranked Bear Brand milk as No. 6 among the top 50 "most popular fast-moving consumer goods" in the Philippines.

Variants

Sterilized milk

Philippines 

 Bear Brand Sterilized tin can – 140 ml
 Bear Brand Sterilized tin can – 155 ml (1906–2016)
 Bear Brand Sterilized Tetra Pak – 200 ml
 Bear Brand Sterilized Tetra Pak – 1 L

Indonesia 
 Bear Brand Susu Steril slim tube – 189 ml

Thailand, Vietnam, Myanmar, Laos and Cambodia 
 Bear Brand Sterilized tin can – 140 ml
 Bear Brand Sterilized Low-Fat tin can – 140 ml
 Bear Brand Sterilized 0% Fat tin can – 140 ml

Milestones

International branding 
In Thailand, the Bear Brand Sterilized is branded by other variants. In Cambodia, Bear Brand was introduced in July 2015, while in Myanmar, Bear Brand was introduced in October 2016. Bear Brand's Indonesian package is in slim tube 189 mL content. In Switzerland, the brand is instead named Bärenmarke in German origin of name.

Logos 

On its introduction in 1906, the Bear Brand logo depicted a bear bottle-feeding a baby bear. The bottle was removed on its logo in 1967.

In 1976, the launch of the Bear Brand Powdered Milk included the bear with a cub and the wordmark. In 1992, the bears refreshed with a cartoony look, and in 1996, the shield appeared one its logo, but in 2002 the shape was changed with the current shield logo form.

In 2004, the logo in most of the countries of Southeast Asia, used the circle logo variant. In 2013, the Bear Brand logo wordmark typeface was changed from Franklin Gothic to Arial for the shield logo. While in their circle logo, since 2016 (for Cambodia, Laos, and Myanmar), uses Helvetica typeface.

Commercials, advertisements and slogans 
In the Philippines, they use the slogan "Tibay Araw-Araw" starting from 2012. Their present "Laki Sa Gatas" nutrition education advocacy program was first launched in 2006.

In 2015, Bear Brand's Alamat ng Matibay book was launched, which introduced the character Mina, and her friend Sonson.

See also

 List of Nestlé brands

References

Further reading

External links

 

Bear
Milk-based drinks
Food and drink in the Philippines
Products introduced in 1892
1892 establishments in the Philippines